The 2005 Brownlow Medal was the 78th year the award was presented to the player adjudged the fairest and best player during the Australian Football League (AFL) home and away season. Ben Cousins of the West Coast Eagles won the medal by polling twenty votes during the 2005 AFL season. It was Cousins' first Brownlow Medal win, and with Daniel Kerr finishing the runner up, it was the first time in 79 years that the top two votegetters were from the same club.

Leading votegetters 

* The player was ineligible to win the medal due to suspension by the AFL Tribunal during the year.

Voting procedure 
The three field umpires (those umpires who control the flow of the game, as opposed to goal or boundary umpires) confer after each match and award three votes, two votes and one vote to the players they regard as the best, second best and third best in the match, respectively. The votes are kept secret until the awards night, and are read and tallied on the evening.

As the medal is awarded to the fairest and best player in the league, those who have been suspended during the season by the AFL Tribunal (or, who avoided suspension only because of a discount for a good record or an early guilty plea) are ineligible to win the award; however, they may still continue to poll votes.

References 

Brownlow Medal, 2005
Brownlow Medal
Brownlow Medal